The New York City Department of Bridges was a municipal government agency that administered the planning, construction, management, and maintenance of bridges in New York City.  The department was created in 1898 with the consolidation of Greater New York, and it operated as one of six co-equal branches of the New York City Board of Public Improvements.  It was later merged with the Department of Public Works in 1916 to form the Department of Plant & Structures.  Its present-day successor is the New York City Department of Transportation. 

Prior to the Department's formation, the work of building and managing transportation infrastructure in the Greater New York area was generally overseen by county-level Boards of Supervisors and their associated Highway Commissioners.  When the city was consolidated under a singular charter in 1898, responsibility for all bridge crossings (including minor roadway spans in the outer boroughs of Brooklyn and Queens) was also consolidated–much to the disagreement of existing highway commissioners.

Organization 
Most of the department's workforce included designers and tradesmen in a variety of support roles, including engineers, riggers, and even firemen.  One record from 1900 counts the organization's maintenance division alone at about 480 workers, with moveable bridge-tenders comprising the largest individual trade.  The department's leadership consisted of a Commissioner of Bridges and a Consulting Engineer.  Appointed by the Mayor of New York City, the Commissioner of Bridges was a mayoral cabinet-level position tasked with administration of the entire department and its divisions.  According to the original city charter, the commissioner was also charged with overseeing departmental finances, toll collection, bridge construction and maintenance, and operation of the Brooklyn Bridge trolleys.

Notable projects 
During its existence, the Department of Bridges initiated and managed the construction of many significant bridges in New York City:

 Williamsburg Bridge (initially known as the "East River Bridge")
 Manhattan Bridge
 Queensboro Bridge
 Hell Gate Bridge
 Madison Avenue Bridge
 University Heights Bridge
 145th Street Bridge
 Grand Street Bridge

References 

1898 establishments in New York City
1916 disestablishments in New York (state)
Bridges in New York City
Bridges, Department of
Government agencies established in 1898
Government agencies disestablished in 1916